Julefrokosten (The Office Party) is a Danish comedyfilm from 1976 instructed and written by Finn Henriksen after a novel by Simon Mikkelstrup.

Cast 
Jesper Langberg as Karlsen
Lisbet Dahl as Henny
Dick Kaysø as Søren
Preben Kaas as Hans Jensen
Jørgen Ryg as Peter Petit Petersen
Judy Gringer as Borgunde
Poul Thomsen as Borgundes husband
Kirsten Norholt as Merete
Torben Jensen as Thorvald
Bjørn Puggaard-Müller as Alf Simonsen
Masja Dessau as Jette
Birgitte Federspiel as Miss Asmussen
Tommy Kenter as Marius
Jessie Rindom as Dame med hund
Otto Brandenburg as Mand i detentionen
Miskow Makwarth as Nattevagt
Finn Henriksen as Taxachauffør
Jan Hougaard as Taxachauffør
Torben Zeller as Betjent
Peter Vincent as Betjent

References

External links

1976 films
Danish comedy films
Films directed by Finn Henriksen